Streltzoviella is a genus of moths in the family Cossidae.

Species
Streltzoviella insularis (Staudinger, 1892)
Streltzoviella owadai Yakovlev, 2011

Etymology
The genus is named in honour of Dr. Alexander N. Streltzov.

References

Natural History Museum Lepidoptera generic names catalog

Cossinae